Dustin Fletcher (born 7 May 1975) is a former professional Australian rules footballer who played his entire 23-season career for the Essendon Football Club in the Australian Football League (AFL). He is widely acknowledged as one of the finest defenders in the history of the league.

AFL career
Fletcher was recruited by the Essendon Football Club in the 1992 National Draft. He played his first senior game against Carlton in his senior year of high school at Penleigh and Essendon Grammar School.

He was a key member of the 1993 premiership team in his first AFL season, a team which is often referred to as the "Baby Bombers".

Fletcher also played in the 2000 premiership team, a year in which he also won the Crichton Medal as Essendon's best and fairest and was selected in the All-Australian team.

Noted for his longevity in the game, Fletcher played a total of 400 senior VFL/AFL games, which stands as the fifth-highest number of games by any player as of 2021. His AFL career length of 22 years and 58 days is an all-time league record (edging out Vic Cumberland, whose former record was 5 days shy of 22 years). Fletcher played his 400th game in Round 9, 2015, becoming the third player in VFL/AFL history to reach the milestone (after Michael Tuck and Kevin Bartlett); it would end up being his final game, as he was unable to recover from a groin injury sustained during the match. He holds the outright Essendon games record, having overtaken the previous record of 378 games held by Simon Madden in Round 1, 2014. He is the second-oldest player to play a VFL/AFL game, aged 40 years and 23 days at the time of his final game, behind only the aforementioned Vic Cumberland (who played the 1920 season at the age of 43). With his father, Ken, the Fletchers hold the record for the most VFL/AFL career games played by a father and son, with 664 games between them. 

On 12 January 2016, during the summer after his retirement, Fletcher was named as one of 34 past and present Essendon players found guilty over their use of illegal supplements during the 2012 AFL season. As a result, Fletcher was suspended from playing at all levels for 24 months, which with backdating and provisional suspension served resulted in suspension until November 2016. However, Fletcher had already retired the previous year, so the suspension was moot. 

After serving his suspension, Fletcher returned in 2017 to play suburban football for Essendon Doutta Stars.

Kicking style
Fletcher's execution of the torpedo punt was often used as a set-play clearing strategy by coach Kevin Sheedy. In a game in 2007, he kicked a torpedo punt goal from more than 70 metres. According to The Sunday Age, it was the fifth-longest kick in the history of the VFL/AFL.

International rules series
Fletcher served as the Australia international rules football team's goalkeeper for five series: the 2005 series, the 2006 series, the 2010 series, the 2014 series, and the 2015 series. Along with Barry Hall, Fletcher was one of Australia's co-captains for the 2006 series. He is regarded as Australia's greatest keeper throughout the series. He retired from top-level football with a final International Rules match, at the 2015 series in Ireland.

Personal life
Dustin's son Mason is the punter for the University of Cincinnati Bearcats in American football. In Mason's freshman (first) season in 2021, the Bearcats became the first-ever team from a Group of Five conference to reach the  College Football Playoff. Mason's sophomore season in 2022, the Bearcats' last before joining the Power Five Big 12 Conference, saw him named the special teams player of the year in the American Athletic Conference.

Statistics

|- style="background-color: #EAEAEA"
|style="text-align:center;background:#afe6ba;"|1993†
|style="text-align:center;"|
| 31 || 17 || 0 || 0 || 128 || 45 || 173 || 43 || 24 || 0.0 || 0.0 || 7.5 || 2.6 || 10.2 || 2.5 || 1.4
|- 
! scope="row" style="text-align:center" | 1994
|style="text-align:center;"|
| 31 || 13 || 2 || 0 || 76 || 41 || 117 || 27 || 10 || 0.2 || 0.0 || 5.8 || 3.2 || 9.0 || 2.1 || 0.8
|- style="background-color: #EAEAEA" 
! scope="row" style="text-align:center" | 1995
|style="text-align:center;"|
| 31 || 22 || 4 || 3 || 199 || 101 || 300 || 94 || 23 || 0.2 || 0.1 || 9.0 || 4.6 || 13.6 || 4.3 || 1.0
|-
! scope="row" style="text-align:center" | 1996
|style="text-align:center;"|
| 31 || 23 || 16 || 10 || 235 || 52 || 287 || 105 || 16 || 0.7 || 0.4 || 10.2 || 2.3 || 12.5 || 4.6 || 0.7
|- style="background-color: #EAEAEA" 
! scope="row" style="text-align:center" | 1997
|style="text-align:center;"|
| 31 || 16 || 9 || 2 || 175 || 62 || 237 || 76 || 14 || 0.6 || 0.1 || 10.9 || 3.9 || 14.8 || 4.8 || 0.9
|-
! scope="row" style="text-align:center" | 1998
|style="text-align:center;"|
| 31 || 18 || 4 || 2 || 186 || 39 || 225 || 57 || 16 || 0.2 || 0.1 || 10.3 || 2.2 || 12.5 || 3.2 || 0.9
|- style="background-color: #EAEAEA" 
! scope="row" style="text-align:center" | 1999
|style="text-align:center;"|
| 31 || 19 || 3 || 8 || 198 || 51 || 249 || 74 || 18 || 0.2 || 0.4 || 10.4 || 2.7 || 13.1 || 3.9 || 1.0
|- 
|style="text-align:center;background:#afe6ba;"|2000†
|style="text-align:center;"|
| 31 || 23 || 14 || 6 || 276 || 81 || 357 || 93 || 26 || 0.6 || 0.3 || 12.0 || 3.5 || 15.5 || 4.0 || 1.1
|- style="background-color: #EAEAEA" 
! scope="row" style="text-align:center" | 2001
|style="text-align:center;"|
| 31 || 21 || 4 || 4 || 239 || 62 || 301 || 78 || 18 || 0.2 || 0.2 || 11.4 || 3.0 || 14.3 || 3.7 || 0.9
|-
! scope="row" style="text-align:center" | 2002
|style="text-align:center;"|
| 31 || 18 || 3 || 2 || 202 || 44 || 246 || 51 || 30 || 0.2 || 0.1 || 11.2 || 2.4 || 13.7 || 2.8 || 1.7
|- style="background-color: #EAEAEA" 
! scope="row" style="text-align:center" | 2003
|style="text-align:center;"|
| 31 || 14 || 0 || 0 || 145 || 34 || 179 || 44 || 14 || 0.0 || 0.0 || 10.4 || 2.4 || 12.8 || 3.1 || 1.0
|-
! scope="row" style="text-align:center" | 2004
|style="text-align:center;"|
| 31 || 20 || 1 || 3 || 220 || 42 || 262 || 70 || 28 || 0.0 || 0.2 || 11.0 || 2.1 || 13.1 || 3.5 || 1.4
|- style="background-color: #EAEAEA" 
! scope="row" style="text-align:center" | 2005
|style="text-align:center;"|
| 31 || 17 || 0 || 0 || 226 || 37 || 263 || 70 || 13 || 0.0 || 0.0 || 13.3 || 2.2 || 15.5 || 4.1 || 0.8
|-
! scope="row" style="text-align:center" | 2006
|style="text-align:center;"|
| 31 || 16 || 0 || 0 || 211 || 67 || 278 || 98 || 12 || 0.0 || 0.0 || 13.2 || 4.2 || 17.4 || 6.1 || 0.8
|- style="background-color: #EAEAEA" 
! scope="row" style="text-align:center" | 2007
|style="text-align:center;"|
| 31 || 19 || 3 || 2 || 309 || 85 || 394 || 144 || 30 || 0.2 || 0.1 || 16.3 || 4.5 || 20.7 || 7.6 || 1.6
|-
! scope="row" style="text-align:center" | 2008
|style="text-align:center;"|
| 31 || 18 || 2 || 3 || 198 || 84 || 282 || 96 || 18 || 0.1 || 0.2 || 11.0 || 4.7 || 15.7 || 5.3 || 1.0
|- style="background-color: #EAEAEA" 
! scope="row" style="text-align:center" | 2009
|style="text-align:center;"|
| 31 || 18 || 1 || 1 || 218 || 102 || 320 || 86 || 30 || 0.1 || 0.1 || 12.1 || 5.7 || 17.8 || 4.8 || 1.7
|-
! scope="row" style="text-align:center" | 2010
|style="text-align:center;"|
| 31 || 16 || 1 || 1 || 216 || 75 || 291 || 79 || 28 || 0.1 || 0.1 || 13.5 || 4.7 || 18.2 || 4.9 || 1.8
|- style="background-color: #EAEAEA" 
! scope="row" style="text-align:center" | 2011
|style="text-align:center;"|
| 31 || 19 || 1 || 0 || 213 || 76 || 289 || 77 || 32 || 0.0 || 0.0 || 11.2 || 4.0 || 15.2 || 4.0 || 1.7
|-
! scope="row" style="text-align:center" | 2012
|style="text-align:center;"|
| 31 || 18 || 1 || 2 || 244 || 45 || 289 || 88 || 20 || 0.1 || 0.1 || 13.6 || 2.5 || 16.1 || 4.9 || 1.1
|- style="background-color: #EAEAEA" 
! scope="row" style="text-align:center" | 2013
|style="text-align:center;"|
| 31 || 13 || 0 || 0 || 151 || 47 || 198 || 63 || 14 || 0.0 || 0.0 || 11.6 || 3.6 || 15.2 || 4.8 || 1.1
|-
! scope="row" style="text-align:center" | 2014
|style="text-align:center;"|
| 31 || 15 || 1 || 0 || 198 || 81 || 279 || 103 || 11 || 0.1 || 0.0 || 13.2 || 5.4 || 18.6 || 6.9 || 0.7
|- style="background-color: #EAEAEA" 
! scope="row" style="text-align:center" | 2015
|style="text-align:center;"|
| 31 || 7 || 1 || 1 || 80 || 36 || 116 || 35 || 6 || 0.1 || 0.1 || 11.4 || 5.1 || 16.6 || 5.0 || 0.9
|- class="sortbottom"
! colspan=3| Career
! 400
! 71
! 50
! 4543
! 1389
! 5932
! 1751
! 451
! 0.2
! 0.1
! 11.4
! 3.5
! 14.8
! 4.4
! 1.1
|}

Honours and achievements
Team
AFL premiership: 1993, 2000
AFL pre-season premiership: 1994, 2000
McClelland Trophy: 1993, 1999, 2000, 2001

Individual
All-Australian team: 2000, 2007
Crichton Medal: 2000
AFL Rising Star Nominee: 1993
International Rules Series Player: 2005, 2006, 2010, 2014, 2015

See also
List of VFL/AFL players to have played 300 games 
List of VFL/AFL records

Footnotes

References

External links

Essendon Football Club players
Essendon Football Club Premiership players
1975 births
Living people
All-Australians (AFL)
Crichton Medal winners
Australian rules footballers from Victoria (Australia)
Western Jets players
Australian sportspeople in doping cases
Australia international rules football team players
People educated at Penleigh and Essendon Grammar School
Two-time VFL/AFL Premiership players